Daniel Collins STP (died 29 March 1648) was a Canon of Windsor from 1631 to 1648

Career

He was educated at Eton College and King's College, Cambridge and graduated BA in 1599, MA in 1601, BD in 1609 and DD in 1626.

He was appointed:
Lecturer at Tring, Reader in Divinity at Ruislip
Rector of Puttenham, Hertfordshire 1610
Lecturer at Windsor
Chaplain to King Charles I
Fellow of Eton 1616 - 1648 and Vicar Provost
Vicar of Ruislip 1617 - 1633, and 1640 - 1641
Rector of Cowley, Middlesex 1629 - 1648
Vicar of Mapledurham 1635 - 1637

He was appointed to the sixth stall in St George's Chapel, Windsor Castle in 1631 and held the canonry until 1648.

Notes 

1648 deaths
Canons of Windsor
Alumni of King's College, Cambridge
People educated at Eton College
Year of birth unknown